Girish (also spelled as Gireesh) is a masculine Hindu name in India which means "lord of the mountain" in Sanskrit ("giri" means rock/mountain and "isha" means shiva). This is a name of Lord Shiva, given because of his abode in the Himalayan Mountains.  

People with the given name include:
 Girish Gangadharan, Indian cinematographer
 Gireesh Kumar Sanghi, Indian politician
 Gireesh Puthenchery, Malayalam lyricist
 Gireesh Sahedev, television actor
 Girish Agarwal, Indian physicist
 Girish Bihari, Indian educationist and IPS officer
 Girish Chandra Ghosh, Bengali theater artist
 Girish Chandra Saxena, a former governor of Jammu and Kashmir state in India
 Girish Chandra Sen, a Brahmo Samaj missionary
 Girish Karnad, Kannada writer, actor
 Girish Kasaravalli, Kannada film director
 Girish Kohli, Indian author
 Girish Kumar, Bollywood film actor
 Girish Kulkarni, Marathi film actor
 Dr. Girish Mishra, Indian author
 Girish Panchwadkar, Marathi singer and music director
 Girish Paranjpe, Indian businessman
 Girish Sant, social activist and energy policy commentator
 Girish Shambu, American film blogger
 Girish Soni, Indian politician
 Girish Tiwari (Girda), activist and writer
 Girish Wagh, Indian businessman
 K. Gireesh Kumar, Malayalam film director and screenwriter

Indian masculine given names
Hindu given names